"Love Is…", written and composed by James Kaleth and Vikki Watson, was the 's entry at the Eurovision Song Contest 1985, performed by Watson, credited at Eurovision and on the single by just her given name.

In Gothenburg, the song was performed fourteenth on the night, after 's Bobbysocks! with "La det swinge", and before 's Mariella Farré and Pino Gasparini with "Piano, piano". At the end of judging that evening, "Love Is…" took the fourth-place slot with 100 points. At the time, it was one of the few entries that managed to receive 100 points without receiving any 12 point allotments from any jury. It was also the UK's strongest performance since winning the 1981 contest with "Making Your Mind Up".

The song was a contemporary ballad about a man and a woman who are both too afraid to plunge head-first with their emotions into a love affair: while both of them want to be loved by the other, both of them are letting their heads rule their hearts. In the chorus, Watson sings that "love is" the product of a number of impulsive decisions, such as "taking a chance on two hearts beating as one". Watson nominally used a single chair as a prop, first sitting in it while singing the song, then circling it and abandoning it entirely by the second half of the song.

Despite the high result in Gothenburg, the song only managed to place at No. 49 on the UK Singles Chart.  The b-side of the single was "Lead Me Through the Darkness"

Charts

References

Eurovision songs of the United Kingdom
Eurovision songs of 1985
1985 in the United Kingdom
1985 singles
1985 songs